Myanmar competed at the 2016 Asian Beach Games held in Danang, Vietnam from 24 September to 3 October 2016.

Competitors

Medal by Date

Medalists

References

Nations at the 2016 Asian Beach Games
Myanmar at the Asian Beach Games
2016 in Burmese sport